Karolina Kochaniak (born 5 July 1995) is a Polish handball player for MKS Zagłębie Lubin and the Polish national team.

She participated at the 2018 European Women's Handball Championship.

References

External links

1995 births
Living people
Sportspeople from Szczecin
Polish female handball players
21st-century Polish women